Totnes railway station serves the towns of Totnes and Dartington in Devon, England. It was opened by the South Devon Railway Company in 1847. Situated on the Exeter to Plymouth Line, it is  measured from the zero point at  via Box.

History

Totnes railway station was built by the South Devon Railway Company and opened on 20 July 1847 when trains started to run on the line from Newton, as Newton Abbot was known at the time. It was a terminus until 5 May 1848 when trains started to run through to Plymouth, initially using a temporary terminus at Laira.  The line was intended to be operated by atmospheric power and an engine house to provide power was built behind the eastbound platform, although it was never brought into use.  The two platform tracks were covered by wooden train sheds, an engine shed was built south of the line beyond the westbound platform, and a goods shed was erected between this platform and the River Dart which the line crossed on a viaduct just to the east of the platforms.

Totnes became the junction for the Buckfastleigh, Totnes and South Devon Railway's line to Ashburton when it opened on 1 May 1872. The South Devon Railway was amalgamated with the Great Western Railway on 1 February 1876 and the Buckfastleigh company was absorbed in 1897.  Trains were suspended on 21 and 22 May 1892 while the original  broad gauge tracks were replaced by those of  standard gauge.  The engine shed was closed in 1904 although the turntable was retained for five more years.

There was a freight only branch line which ran down to the quay at Totnes wharf (plains), the bridge which carried this line can still be partially seen adjacent to the footpath which leads from the BR station towards the riverside walk. The line crossed over the main road at the bottom of Bridgetown bridge via a level crossing to access The Plains. Some of the track formation can still be seen on The Plains. The westbound platform was damaged during an air raid in World War II on 21 October 1942.  The Ashburton branch train was damaged in the attack, two people killed and two more injured.

On 1 January 1948 the Great Western Railway was nationalised to become the Western Region of British Railways.  Passenger services to Ashburton were withdrawn on 3 November 1958 and the line closed entirely on 10 September 1962.  A few months earlier, on 14 April 1962, a fire destroyed the main buildings situated on the westbound platform at Totnes. General goods traffic was withdrawn on 14 June 1965 although coal continued to be handled until 4 December 1967 and milk until 1980, from the dairy that incorporates the building intended for the atmospheric engines.

A new station building was opened on 21 October 1983 to replace the temporary buildings that had served the station since the fire in 1962. From 5 April 1985 to 2 September 1987 trains on the Buckfastleigh line, now the South Devon Railway heritage line, operated into the station.

The 1887-built footbridge that spanned the station and gave access to the operating floor of the signal box was destroyed on 18 October 1987 when hit by a crane engaged in track renewals. It was replaced by a new bridge which was in turn replaced by a newer footbridge and lifts in 2019.

Accidents and incidents 
On 13 March 1860 the boiler of the locomotive Tornado exploded while standing at Totnes, killing the driver.

Station masters

William Edward James 1852 - 1888
Charles Culyer 1888 - 1892  
Stephen Pascoe Brewer 1892 - 1896 (afterwards night station master at London Paddington)
Frederick Angle 1896 - 1899 (afterwards station master at )
James William Jones 1899 - 1916 (formerly station master at Salisbury)
A.W. Bickford 1916 (afterwards station master at )
James Pegler 1916 - 1924  (afterwards station master at Falmouth)
R.G. Randall 1924 - 1929 (afterwards station master at Falmouth Docks)
Frank Gale 1929 - 1938 (afterwards station master at )
W.E. Pearce 1938 - 1950
William H. Needle 1956 - 1966 (formerly station master at )

Description

The railway approaches from Newton Abbot in the north-east runs south-westerly through the station and then swings to the west on a right-hand curve, which is the start of the steep climb up to Rattery. There are four tracks through the station with platforms alongside the outer pair.

The modern brick-built station building is on the south-east side of the station, nearest the town. This is the platform for trains to Plymouth and Penzance. Trains to Newton Abbot, Exeter and beyond depart from the opposite platform, which can be reached by a footbridge on the south-west side of the entrance to the platform. The old signal box on the platform used by trains to Newton Abbot serves as the station café.

There is level access to the station from the car park on the south-east side and also from the area in front of the milk factory on the north-west side which can be reached by the road bridge that spans the tracks just to the south-west of the station. The industrial complex on the north-west side of the station houses the milk factory; the grey stone building behind the signal box is the atmospheric engine house. The opposite side of the station is dominated by Totnes Castle, on the hill.

Services
About half of the services are operated by Great Western Railway, including main line services from London Paddington to Plymouth and Penzance.  The rest are run by CrossCountry, who operate trains from Plymouth and Penzance through  and Birmingham New Street to Manchester Piccadilly, the north east of England ( and Newcastle) and Scotland ( & /). Service frequencies to and from London Paddington are approximately hourly for much of the day.

|-
|colspan=5|Interchange with Totnes (Riverside) on the South Devon Railway

Signalling 

The signals were initially controlled by "policemen" who walked to each signal to change it, but from 1894 they were controlled from a wooden signal box at the west end of the westbound platform.  This was replaced in 1923 by a brick-built signal box towards the opposite end of the eastbound platform.  From 17 December 1973 this was a "fringe box" to the Panel Signal Box at Plymouth railway station, when the signal boxes at Brent and other intermediate locations were closed.  Totnes itself was closed on 9 November 1987 when new multiple-aspect signals were brought into use, controlled from the new signalling centre at Exeter. The signal box, a Grade II listed building, is now used as a café.

Connections 
Buses to Dartmouth operate from the car park on the south-east side. A footpath from here leads under the viaduct at the north-east end of the station to a footbridge that crosses the River Dart alongside the railway to reach Totnes Riverside station, from where trains run to Buckfastleigh railway station.

References

External links

 Totnes On Line – Brunel engine house photographs
 Video footage of Totnes Station and pumping engine house

Totnes
1847 establishments in England
Railway stations in Devon
Former Great Western Railway stations
Railway stations in Great Britain opened in 1847
Railway stations served by Great Western Railway
Railway stations served by CrossCountry
DfT Category D stations